AMC-1 is a geosynchronous communications satellite operated by SES S.A., as part of the AMC fleet acquired from GE AMERICOM in 2001. It was a hybrid C-Band / Ku-band spacecraft currently located at 131° West, serving the Canada, United States, Mexico, and Caribbean.

AMC-1 was replaced by the newer SES-3 satellite on 15 July 2011.

Specifications 
C-band payload: 24 x 36 MHz
Amp type: SSPA, 12- to 18-watt (adjustable)
Amp redundancy: 16 for 12
Receiver redundancy: 4 for 2
Coverage: CONUS, Alaska, Hawaii, Mexico, Caribbean, Canada

Ku-band payload: 24 x 36 MHz
Amp type: TWTA, 60-watt
Amp redundancy: 18 for 12
Receiver redundancy: 4 for 2
Coverage: Contiguous United States, Alaska, Hawaii, Northern Mexico, Southern Canada

References 

SES satellites
Spacecraft launched in 1996
AMC-01
Communications satellites in geostationary orbit